Johan Gerard "Boy" Hayje (born 3 May 1949, Amsterdam) is a former racing driver from the Netherlands.  He participated in seven Formula One Grands Prix, debuting on 29 August 1976.  He scored no championship points.

After time spent racing saloon cars and winning the Dutch Formula Ford championship, Hayje raced in Formula 5000 and Formula 3.  He drove a privately entered Penske in his home grand prix in 1976, before a difficult period in Formula One the following year driving a March for RAM Racing.

Once his Formula One career was over, Hayje raced in the European Renault 5 Turbo championship.

Racing record

Complete European F5000 Championship results
(key)

Complete Formula One results
(key)

Complete World Sportscar Championship results
(key)

Footnotes

Complete Shellsport International Series results
(key)

Complete European Formula Two Championship results
(key)

Complete British Formula One Championship results
(key)

Complete 24 Hours of Le Mans results

References

External links

Profile at grandprix.com

1949 births
Living people
Dutch racing drivers
Dutch Formula One drivers
RAM Racing Formula One drivers
Sportspeople from Amsterdam
24 Hours of Le Mans drivers
World Sportscar Championship drivers
British Formula One Championship drivers